Vasilyevo is a rural locality (a village) in Tyuldinsky Selsoviet, Kaltasinsky District, Bashkortostan, Russia. The population was 31 as of 2010. There is 1 street.

Geography 
Vasilyevo is located 21 km northwest of Kaltasy (the district's administrative centre) by road. Sredny Kachmash is the nearest rural locality.

References 

Rural localities in Kaltasinsky District